The following is a list of Oricon number-one singles of 2001.

Oricon Weekly Singles Chart

References 

2001 in Japanese music
Japan Oricon
Oricon 2001